Elia Dagani (born 3 February 1998) is a Swiss épée fencer. He started fencing at the age of five. Dagani studied economics and management at the University of Milan. His club is Lugano Scherma.

Dagani participated at the 2018 European Fencing Under 23 Championships, where he won a gold medal.

References

External links
 
 
 Elia Dagani at Lugano Scherma  (in English)
 

1998 births
Living people
Swiss male épée fencers
Sportspeople from Lugano